Garnethill is a predominantly residential area of the city of Glasgow, Scotland with a number of important public buildings.

Geography

Located in the city centre, the area borders Cowcaddens to its north, Sauchiehall Street to its south, Cambridge Street to its east and now the M8 motorway to its west. The hill forms part of the historic Lands of Blythswood which the Douglas-Campbell families sold in stages from the late 18th century onwards, the largest purchaser/developer being William Harley of Blythswood Hill, cotton merchant and builder. Harley laid out Renfrew Street and encouraged the building of villas, which extended round into St George's Road. One major site was developed as Garnethill Observatory in 1810. Later developments included spacious tenements as families moved upward from the overcrowded Cowcaddens. Harley also laid out Blythswood Square.

The area was named Garnet Hill by William Harley, in honour of Professor Thomas Garnett, one of the first professors of Anderson's Institution, known today as Strathclyde University.

Demography
Garnethill is ethnically diverse, with significant ethnically Scottish, Pakistani, Arab, Indian, Chinese and African populations.

Sites

The Glasgow School of Art, designed by Charles Rennie Mackintosh and the Glasgow Film Theatre are located in Garnethill.  It is also the location of Scotland's oldest and first purpose-built synagogue Garnethill Synagogue, founded in 1879, and the Glasgow Dental Hospital and School. Garnethill is also home to St. Aloysius' RC Church, built in 1910.

Schools
Garnetbank Primary School is situated on Renfrew Street opposite Renfrew Street Nursery School.

There is a private school, St Aloysius' College, whose Clavius building and Junior School both recently won architectural awards. St Aloysius' College also have a 4-storey sports complex on Dalhousie Street between Hill Street and Renfrew Street.

Buildings
Garnethill is a conservation area and contains several listed buildings, most significantly Glasgow School of Art designed by Charles Rennie Macintosh. Housing listed includes Breadalbane Terrace built between 1845 - 1855 by Charles Wilson. Heritage buildings which are now apartments include the first Beatson Cancer Hospital, in Hill Street, and the Glasgow High School for Girls, in Buccleuch Street.

The rebuilding of the fire-damaged, and twice gutted, unique Mackintosh Building of Glasgow School of Art in Renfrew Street is awaited.

During the 1960s and 1970s, Garnethill became the principal centre of Scotland's Chinese community, with Cantonese speaking immigrants from Hong Kong settling in the area. Most had already settled in the UK, and moved north from England. As a result, the neighbourhood is home to Glasgow's Chinatown shopping mall on New City Road.

Streets
Garnethill comprises the following streets:
West Graham Street
Buccleuch Street
Hill Street, which was home to 4 of the last 15 Turner Prize winners
Renfrew Street
Garnet Street
Garnethill Street
Scott Street
Dalhousie Street
Rose Street
New City Road
Shamrock Street
Cambridge Street

Community groups

The Community Council is the longest established community group in Garnethill (since 1970's), and is currently operating with all ten positions filled following a contested election held in October 2018. The Community Councillors meet the second Thursday of the month 7pm-9pm, currently on Zoom. The meetings are open to the public and deal with community development, local issues, planning and licensing issues etc. Local councillors, art school liaison and police attend.

A Neighbourhood Watch was setup in 2017 and they hold their public meetings in the Garnethill Multicultural Centre. Police Scotland are normally invited along to provide any updates, and for residents to raise any issues.

The Friends of Garnethill Greenspaces (FROGGS) is a constituted group whose focus is the green spaces of Garnethill, including the Garnethill Park. They organise and publicise regular community meetings e.g. litter picks and firing up of the Bread Oven in the park, etc. They have sourced funding and provided attractive planters on railings around the area.

There is also a Garnetbank Parents Council which has been running for many years, and is a group of parents whose offspring attend the Garnetbank Primary School on Renfrew Street. They operate mainly on Facebook and Twitter.

Literature
Garnethill is the first and title volume of a trilogy of crime novels by Glaswegian author Denise Mina.  All three books are predominantly set in and around Garnethill, Glasgow, and its environs.

Notable people 

 Thomas King, botanist, lived at 110 Hill Street

References

Areas of Glasgow
Chinese diaspora in Europe